Darband Esfejir (also Romanized as Darband Esfejīr, Darband-e Esfajīr, and Darband-e Esfejīr; also known as Darband-e Esfenjīr, Darbandī and Darbandī) is a village in Hesar Rural District, Khabushan District, Faruj County, North Khorasan Province, Iran. At the 2006 census, its population was 214, in 63 families.

References 

Populated places in Faruj County